The Curtiss No. 2, often known as the Reims Racer, was a racing aircraft built in the United States by Glenn Curtiss in 1909 to contest the Gordon Bennett Cup air race in Reims, France that year.

Design and characteristics
The No. 2 was a modified Golden Flyer (also known as the Curtiss No. 1), and was an open-framework biplane with two-bay unstaggered wings of equal span. It had an all-moving cruciform tail unit comprising a small elevator surface plus a rudder for directional control, but larger elevators were carried forward of the pilot as a biplane canard unit. The landing gear was in a tricycle configuration, with three individual wheels. Large ailerons were carried in the interplane gap.

Curtiss had modified the Golden Flyer into the Reims Racer by adding a covered stabilizer unit at the canard position, increasing the wing size, modifying the interplane ailerons and replacing the 25 hp four cylinder inline Curtiss OX engine with a 63 hp Curtiss OX V8 that had been stripped down and specially lightened for the race. A new, lighter fuel tank was exchanged for the older, heavier one.

A transverse-rocking, metal framework "shoulder cradle", hinged longitudinally on either side of the pilot's seat, with forward-projecting members, one per side resting against the midpoint of each of the pilot's upper arms (see photo of Curtiss in the pilot's seat), achieved the connection between the pilot and aileron control cabling. This apparatus required the pilot to "lean-into" the turn to operate the ailerons and thus turn the aircraft in the same direction. This system was later used again in the Curtiss Model D.

Operational history
Curtiss' participation in the race was sponsored by the Aero Club of America, which had offered to back him after a similar offer was turned down by the Wright brothers. While not as fast as its European competitors, the Reims Racer was more maneuverable, and Curtiss, who piloted the machine himself, was able to take advantage of this by paying special attention to his turns. The first competitor to fly, Curtiss recorded a time of 15 minutes 50.4 seconds for the two 10 km circuits required. When Louis Bleriot made the final flight of the competition, he recorded a time 5.8 seconds longer, leaving Curtiss to claim the FF 25,000 prize. Curtiss's flight, at an average speed of 47.06 mph (75.48 km/h) was also a new airspeed record for the distance.

After Reims, Curtiss took the aircraft to Italy, where he won events at a competition at the Air Show in Brescia in September 1909. There, he won the overall grand prize by flying the required five 10 km circuits in 49 minutes 24 seconds. He also won the quick starting prize, starting his engine in 8.2 seconds, and took second place to Henri Rougier in the altitude prize, climbing to 165 ft (51 m). While at Brescia, Curtiss gave Italian poet Gabriele d'Annunzio a short joyride, but declined a similar request by Princess Laetitia on the grounds that the seat would be unsuitable.

Returning to the United States, Curtiss flew the Reims Racer in the country's first air meet at Dominguez Hills in October 1909, setting a new airspeed record of 55 mph (88 km/h).

Curtiss sold the Reims Racer to Charles Hamilton, who crashed it in Seattle on 12 March 1910.

The book "How to Fly" – or The Conquest of the Air – published in 1910 by Thomas Nelson & Sons has a description of how to fly this aircraft (pp 157 to 162) as follows:

"There is a diversity of design in the arrangement of the means of control. We shall describe that of the Curtiss biplane, as largely typical of them all.  In general, the biplane consists of two large sustaining planes, one above the other. Between the planes is the motor which operates a propeller located in the rear of the planes. Projecting behind the planes, and held by a framework of bamboo rods, is a small horizontal plane, called the tail. The rudder which guides the aeroplane to the right or the left is partially bisected by the tail. This rudder is worked by wires which run to a steering wheel located in front of the pilot's seat. This wheel is similar in size and appearance to the steering wheel of an automobile, and is used in the same way for guiding the aeroplane to the right or left.
In front of the planes, supported on a shorter projecting framework, is the altitude rudder, a pair of planes hinged horizontally, so that their front edges may tip up or down. When they tilt up, the air through which the machine is passing catches on the under sides and lifts them up, thus elevating the front of the whole aeroplane and causing it to glide upward. The opposite action takes place when these altitude planes are tilted downward.  This altitude rudder is controlled by a long rod which runs to the steering wheel. By pushing on the wheel the rod is shoved forward and turns the altitude planes downward. Pulling the wheel turns the rudder planes upward. This rod has a backward and forward thrust of over two feet, but the usual movement in ordinary wind currents is rarely more than an inch.  In climbing to high levels or swooping down rapidly the extreme play of the rod is about four or five inches.
Thus the steering wheel controls both the horizontal and vertical movements of the aeroplane. More than this, it is a feeler to the aviator, warning him of the condition of the air currents, and for this reason must not be grasped too firmly. It is to be held steady, yet loosely enough to transmit any wavering force in the air to the sensitive touch of the pilot, enabling him instinctively to rise or dip as the current compels. 

The preserving of an even keel is accomplished in the Curtiss machine by small planes hinged between the main planes at the outer ends. They serve to prevent the machine from tipping over sideways. They are operated by arms, projecting from the back of the aviator's seat, which embrace his shoulders on each side, and are moved by the swaying of his body. In a measure, they are automatic in action, for when the aeroplane sags downward on one side, the pilot naturally leans the other way to preserve his balance, and that motion swings the ailerons (as these small stabilizing planes are called) in such a way that the pressure of the wind restores the aeroplane to an even keel. The wires which connect them with the back of the seat are so arranged that when one aileron is being pulled down at its rear edge the rear of the other one is being raised, thus doubling the effect. As the machine is righted the aviator comes back to an upright position, and the ailerons become level once more.  There are other controls which the pilot must operate consciously. In the Curtiss machine these are levers moved by the feet. With a pressure of the right foot he short-circuits the magneto, thus cutting off the spark in the engine cylinders and stopping the motor. This lever also puts a brake on the forward landing wheels, and checks the speed of the machine as it touches the ground. The right foot also controls the pump which forces the lubricating oil faster or slower to the points where it is needed.  The left foot operates the lever which controls the throttle by which the aviator can regulate the flow of gas to the engine cylinders. The average speed of the 7-foot propeller is 1,100 revolutions per minute.  With the throttle it may be cut down to 100 revolutions per minute, which is not fast enough to keep afloat, but will help along when gliding."

Specifications

References

 Citations

 Bibliography
 Casey, Louis S. Curtiss, The Hammondsport Era, 1907–1915, New York: Crown Publishers, 1981, pp. 12–15, .
 
 airracinghistory.freeola.com
 aerofiles.com
 NASM
 centennialofflight.net
 New York Times 13 September 1909
 

1900s United States sport aircraft
02
Single-engined pusher aircraft
Canard aircraft
Aircraft first flown in 1909